Ellabella editha is a moth in the Copromorphidae family. It is found in North America, where it has been recorded from Alberta, British Columbia, Arizona, Colorado, New Mexico, Oregon, South Dakota, Texas, Utah, Washington and Wyoming.

The length of the forewings is 9.5–11 mm for males and 8-11.5 mm for females. The forewings are grey-brown, irrorated with white and in the apical and basal area along the costal margin. The hindwings are grey-brown. Adults are on wing from May to August.

The larvae possibly feed on Mahonia repens.

References

Natural History Museum Lepidoptera generic names catalog

Copromorphidae
Moths described in 1925